Dorceus is a genus of velvet spiders that was first described by C. L. Koch in 1846.

Species
 it contains five species:
Dorceus albolunulatus (Simon, 1876) – Algeria
Dorceus fastuosus C. L. Koch, 1846 (type) – Tunisia, Senegal, Israel
Dorceus latifrons Simon, 1873 – Algeria, Tunisia
Dorceus quadrispilotus Simon, 1908 – Egypt
Dorceus trianguliceps Simon, 1911 – Tunisia

References

External links

Araneomorphae genera
Eresidae